Armston is a hamlet in Northamptonshire, England. The population is included in the civil parish of Polebrook.

The hamlets name means 'Eorm's/Earnmund's farm/settlement'.

References

External links
 
 

Hamlets in Northamptonshire
North Northamptonshire